Asymbolus is a genus of catsharks in the family Scyliorhinidae.

Species
The currently recognized species in this genus are:
 Asymbolus analis (J. D. Ogilby, 1885) (Australian spotted catshark)
 Asymbolus funebris Compagno, Stevens & Last, 1999  (blotched catshark)
 Asymbolus galacticus Séret & Last, 2008 (starry catshark)
 Asymbolus occiduus Last, M. F. Gomon & Gledhill, 1999 (western spotted catshark)
 Asymbolus pallidus Last, M. F. Gomon & Gledhill, 1999 (pale spotted catshark)
 Asymbolus parvus Compagno, Stevens & Last, 1999 (dwarf catshark)
 Asymbolus rubiginosus Last, M. F. Gomon & Gledhill, 1999 (orange-spotted catshark)
 Asymbolus submaculatus Compagno, Stevens & Last, 1999 (variegated catshark)
 Asymbolus vincenti (Zietz (fi), 1908) (gulf catshark)

References

 
Shark genera
Taxa named by Gilbert Percy Whitley